Grevillea minutiflora is a species of flowering plant in the family Proteaceae and is endemic to the south-west of Western Australia. It is a shrub with many branches, tangled, divided leaves, the end lobes more or less linear, and cylindrical clusters of creamy-white flowers.

Description

Taxonomy
Grevillea minutiflora was first formally described in 1986 by Donald McGillivray in his book New Names in Grevillea (Proteaceae) from specimens collected near Mukinbudin in 1976. The specific epithet (minutiflora) means "very small-flowered".

Distribution and habitat
This grevillea grows in shrubland and is restricted to the area around Mukinbudin in the Avon Wheatbelt bioregion of inland south-western Western Australia.

Conservation status
Grevillea minutiflora is listed as "Priority One" by the Government of Western Australia Department of Biodiversity, Conservation and Attractions, meaning that it is known from only one or a few locations which are potentially at risk.

See also
 List of Grevillea species

References

minutiflora
Proteales of Australia
Eudicots of Western Australia
Taxa named by Donald McGillivray